Kanekotrochus infuscatusis, common name the dusky jewel top shell, a species of sea snail, a marine gastropod mollusk in the family Trochidae, the top snails

Description
The size of the adult shell of this species varies between 7 mm and 16 mm.

Distribution
This marine species occurs off Japan and the Philippines.

References

 Higo, S., Callomon, P. & Goto, Y. (1999). Catalogue and bibliography of the marine shell-bearing Mollusca of Japan. Osaka. : Elle Scientific Publications. 749 pp.
 Dekker H. (2006). Description of a new species of Kanekotrochus (Gastropoda: Trochidae) from Vietnam. Miscellanea Malacologia, 2(1): 1–4

External links
 shtml  Gastropods.com: Kanekotrochus infuscatus

infuscatus
Gastropods described in 1861